The Ministry of Energy and Petroleum (Abbreviation: MoEP) is the government ministry in charge of extending and ensuring a continuous supply of energy services to every division of the Ghanaian economy in an energy sufficient, environmentally friendly manner.

Functions of the Ministry
The function of the ministry is to improve the distribution of electricity across the country, especially to communities and towns in rural Ghana. The ministry seeks to encourage the participation of the private sector in the development of energy infrastructure and secure future energy supply.

Sector minister
The minister for energy and petroleum is the head of the ministry and is directly accountable to the President of Ghana. The position is politically appointed and approved by parliament of Ghana. The current minister is John Peter Amewu who succeeds  Boakye Agyarko temporarily after being sacked by the President on the 6 August 2018 who succeeded Emmanuel Armah Kofi Buah who was the sector minister under the Mahama administration government in 2013.

Achievements
The ministry has increased the number of towns and communities on the national grid as well as improved the quality of supply of electricity. In 2002 the Tema Oil Refinery in Tema was fitted with a residual fuel catalytic cracker.  This was to allow for the recovery of additional refined products from fuel oil that were previously wasted. In 2003, it completed and commissioned a 161 kilovolts transmission line to supply the Prestea to Obuasi. The ministry also advanced policies on deregulating the petroleum sector in Ghana. Under the Rural Kerosine Distribution Improvement Program, the ministry financed the fabrication and distribution of 700 kerosene tanks for each of the country's 110 districts. The ministry distributed televisions and installed solar panels in 160 Junior High Schools in all ten regions of Ghana to enable school children in rural communities to watch the weekly Presidents Special Initiative on Distance Learning Program while in school. This is to promote teaching and learning in schools that do not have an electricity supply.

Agencies under the ministry
The ministry has oversight responsibility over certain agencies. They include:
Ghana National Petroleum Corporation (GNPC)
Ghana National Gas Company (GNGC)
National Petroleum Authority (NPA)
Bulk Oil Storage and Transportation (BOST)
Tema Oil Refinery (TOR) 
Ghana Cylinder Manufacturing Company (GCMC)
Volta River Authority (VRA)
Ghana Grid Company (GRIDCo)
Electricity Company of Ghana (ECG)
Northern Electricity Company (NEDCo)
Bui Power Authority (BUI)
Volta Aluminium Company (VALCO)
Energy Commission (Ghana)
Petroleum Commission (Ghana)

See also
 Electricity sector in Ghana

References

External links
 Official Website

Energy and Petroleum
Ghana
Government agencies established in 1957
1957 establishments in Ghana